Merle Middleton Odgers (April 21, 1900 - September 6, 1983) was president of Bucknell University from 1954 until his retirement in 1964, when he was named president emeritus.

Born in Philadelphia, he graduated from the University of Pennsylvania in 1922. After receiving his doctorate in 1928, he taught at the university until 1933, when he was named dean of their College of Liberal Arts for Women. Odgers was then president of Girard College, a Philadelphia secondary school for orphan boys, from 1936 to 1954.

Odgers authored Alexander Dallas Bache: Scientist and Educator, published by the University of Pennsylvania Press in 1947.

References

Presidents of Bucknell University
University of Pennsylvania alumni
University of Pennsylvania faculty
1900 births
1983 deaths
Educators from Philadelphia
20th-century American academics